Scalpel, Please is a 1985 Czech psychological drama film directed by Jiří Svoboda. It was entered into the 14th Moscow International Film Festival. The film was selected as the Czechoslovakia entry for the Best Foreign Language Film at the 58th Academy Awards, but was not accepted as a nominee.

Cast
 Miroslav Macháček as Professor
 Jana Brejchová as Jitka
 Radoslav Brzobohatý as Krtek
 Barbara Brylska as Med. assistant
 Marie Durnová as Zita
 Jana Krausová as Helena
 Jakub Zdenek as Uzlik

See also
 List of submissions to the 58th Academy Awards for Best Foreign Language Film
 List of Czechoslovak submissions for the Academy Award for Best Foreign Language Film

References

External links
 

1985 films
1980s psychological drama films
Czech drama films
Czechoslovak drama films
1980s Czech-language films
1985 drama films
1980s Czech films